Skuratov is a Russian masculine surname, its feminine counterpart is Skuratova. 

It may refer to:
Malyuta Skuratov (died 1573), Russian noble and opposition leader;
Maria Skuratova-Belskaya (died 1605), Russian Tsaritsa, daughter of Malyuta; and
Yury Skuratov (born 1952), Russian lawyer and politician.

Russian-language surnames